National symbols of Australia are the official symbols used to represent Australia as a nation or the Commonwealth Government. Additionally, each state and territory has its own set of symbols.

List of symbols

See also

 District tartans of Australia
 List of Australian flags

References

External links
 National symbolsaustralia.gov.au Retrieved 18 March 2018.
 Australian National Symbolspmc.gov.au Retrieved 18 March 2018.
 Australia's National Symbolsdfat.gov.au Retrieved 18 March 2018.

 
Australian patriotism